The 1979 Formula 750 season was the seventh and last season of the FIM Formula 750 World Championship and the third season to have full world championship status. Patrick Pons was crowned champion and became the first Frenchman to win an F.I.M. world championship.

Championship standings

References

See also
 1979 Grand Prix motorcycle racing season

Formula 750
Formula 750